Clavulinopsis fusiformis, commonly known as golden spindles, spindle-shaped yellow coral, or spindle-shaped fairy club, is a species of coral fungus in the family Clavariaceae.

Taxonomy

The species was first described as Clavaria fusiformis by English botanist James Sowerby in 1799, from collections made in Hampstead Heath in London. Elias Fries called it a variety of Clavaria inaequalis in 1828. It was transferred to Clavulinopsis by E.J.H. Corner in 1950. Ronald H. Petersen transferred it to Ramariopsis in 1978.

The specific epithet fusiformis, derived from Latin, means "spindle-shaped". It is commonly known variously as "golden spindles", "spindle-shaped yellow coral", or "spindle-shaped fairy club" or, recently "French Fries Mushroom".

Description

The firm and brittle flesh, also yellow, becomes hollow in maturity. The spores are broadly ellipsoid to roughly spherical, smooth, with dimensions of 5–9 by 4.5–8.5 µm. They have an apiculus that measures 1–2 µm long, and either a large oil droplet or several oil droplets. The basidia (spore-bearing cell) are club-shaped, measure 40–65 by 6–9 µm with a long cylindrical base that is 1.5–2.5 µm wide. It has a clamp connection at the base. Most basidia are four-spored, although there are occasionally two- and three-spored versions. The flesh comprises both inflated hyphae up to 12 µm, and narrow hyphae up to 4  µm. It is nonpoisonous, and has been described as both edible and inedible in field guides. Fruit bodies are commonly collected and consumed in Nepal, where it is known locally as Kesari chyau.

Similar species

Clavaria fragilis is similar in size and morphology, but is white. Clavaria amoenoides is similar in size, and like Clavulinopsis fusiformis, grows in dense clusters, but it is much rarer. It can be readily distinguished from C. fusiformis by microscopic examination, as it has inflated hyphae that lack clamp connections. Similarly, C. helvola and C. luteoalba have similar coloration, but are smaller and do not typically grow in clusters.

Habitat and distribution

Clavulinopsis fusiformis is a saprobic species. Fruit bodies grow on the ground in loose to dense clusters and scattered troops in grassy areas and among moss. In Asia, it has been reported from Iran, China, Nepal, and Japan. It is also found in Europe and North America.

Chemistry

The extract of Clavulinopsis fusiformis contains anti-B red blood cell agglutinin.

References

External links

Fungi described in 1799
Fungi of Asia
Fungi of Europe
Fungi of North America
Clavariaceae
Taxa named by James Sowerby